Claude Dilain (12 August 1948 – 3 March 2015) was a French politician. He was a member of the French Senate from 2011 until his death in 2015. He also served as Mayor of Clichy-sous-Bois.

References

1948 births
2015 deaths
People from Saint-Denis, Seine-Saint-Denis
Mayors of places in Île-de-France
Socialist Party (France) politicians
French pediatricians
Senators of Seine-Saint-Denis